87 Leonis is a single star in the zodiac constellation of Leo, located approximately 480 light years away from the Sun. It has the Bayer designation e Leonis; 87 Leonis is the Flamsteed designation. This object is visible by the naked eye as a faint orange-hued star with an apparent visual magnitude of 4.77. It is moving away from the Earth with a heliocentric radial velocity of 19 km/s. The star is positioned near the ecliptic and thus is subject to occultation by the Moon.

The suffix notation indicates a mild underabundance of iron in the atmosphere. It has expanded to 37 times the Sun's radius and is radiating over a thousand times the Sun's luminosity from its photosphere at an effective temperature of 4,001 K.

References 

K-type giants
Leo (constellation)
Leonis, e
Durchmusterung objects
Leonis, 87
099998
056127
4432